This is a list of all cricketers who have played first-class, List A or Twenty20 cricket for Delhi cricket team. Seasons given are first and last seasons; the player did not necessarily play in all the intervening seasons. Players in bold have played international cricket.

Last updated at the end of the 2015/16 season.

A
 Abdul Hai, 1934/35-1935/36
 Abdul Hamid, 1936/37
 Abdul Majid, 1936/37
 Abdur Rauf, 1944/45-1946/47
 Mohit Ahlawat, 2015/16
 Akhtar Hussain, 1945/46
 Mohinder Amarnath, 1974/75-1988/89
 Rajinder Amarnath, 1981/82
 Surinder Amarnath, 1974/75-1981/82
 Jagrit Anand, 2011/12-2014/15
 Tummala Anand, 2001/02
 BN Andley, 1964/65
 Sandeep Angurala, 1994/95-2000/01
 Anwar Khan, 1938/39-1939/40
 Arun Singh, 1998/99-2002/03
 Vemulapally Arvind, 1991/92-1992/93
 Ashanul Haque, 1945/46
 Gerald Aste, 1935/36
 Parvinder Awana, 2007/08-2015/16
 Bharat Awasthy, 1958/59-1960/61
 Kirti Azad, 1977/78-1993/94

B
 Badaruddin Malik, 1946/47
 Bikker Bahadur, 1980/81
 Kiran Bahadur, 1938/39-1948/49
 Shiv Bahry, 1950/51-1951/52
 S Balaram, 1979/80-1980/81
 Abhinav Bali, 2003/04-2006/07
 Balwant Singh, 1967/68-1970/71
 Bantoo Singh, 1985/86-1995/96
 Jaswant Bawa, 1949/50-1952/53
 Bishan Bedi, 1968/69-1980/81
 Dharam Beniwal, 1996/97
 Hargopal Berry, 1948/49
 Amit Bhandari, 1997/98-2008/09
 Arvind Bhandari, 1958/59
 Prakash Bhandari, 1952/53-1968/69
 Anil Bhardwaj, 1975/76
 Sanjay Bhardwaj, 1986/87-1987/88
 Suboth Bhati, 2015/16
 Ajit Bhatia, 1955/56
 Anand Bhatia, 1966/67
 Prem Bhatia, 1958/59-1968/69
 Rajat Bhatia, 2003/04-2014/15
 Saket Bhatia, 2002/03
 Manohar Bhide, 1943/44
 Bhupinder Singh, 1983/84
 Bhupinder Singh, 1997/98
 Vijay Bhushan, 1960/61-1962/63
 Bishan Bihari, 1948/49-1952/53
 Puneet Bisht, 2005/06-2015/16
 Geoffrey Bull, 1935/36-1936/37

C
 Unmukt Chand, 2009/10-2015/16
 Jyotish Chander, 1956/57
 KS Chatrapalsinhji, 1957/58
 Mohan Chaturvedi, 1989/90-1995/96
 Harendra Chaudhary, 1996/97-2003/04
 Chetan Chauhan, 1975/76-1984/85
 HS Chauhan, 1980/81
 Manoj Chauhan, 2010/11-2013/14
 Pratap Chauhan, 1958/59
 Neeraj Chawla, 1999/00
 Pradeep Chawla, 2000/01-2007/08
 Gaurav Chhabra, 2005/06-2010/11
 Mohan Chibber, 1990/91
 Pravesh Chimkara, 2009/10
 Aakash Chopra, 1996/97-2009/10
 Deepak Chopra, 1980/81-1982/83
 Nikhil Chopra, 1993/94-2000/01
 Rajneesh Chopra, 1993/94-1998/99
 Dilip Chowdhury, 1962/63
 Yogendra Chowdhury, 1953/54-1958/59

D
 Vijay Dahiya, 1993/94-2006/07
 Daljit Singh, 1965/66
 Michael Dalvi, 1966/67
 Ashu Dani, 1994/95-2000/01
 Darshan Swaroop, 1949/50-1952/53
 Ishwar Dayal, 1944/45-1948/49
 Anthony de Mello, 1940/41-1945/46
 Ramesh Dewan, 1959/60-1960/61
 Meghraj Dhannu, 1969/70-1972/73
 Dharam Vir, 1967/68
 Shikhar Dhawan, 2004/05-2015/16
 GM Din, 1934/35-1939/40
 Ajay Divecha, 1964/65
 Mukesh Diwan, 2005/06
 Rahul Dixit, 1980/81-1987/88
 Thomas Dixon, 1934/35-1936/37
 Sumeet Dogra, 1993/94-1998/99
 Baldev Dua, 1968/69
 Karun Dubey, 1978/79
 Ravi Dutt, 1951/52-1952/53
 Surendra Dyama, 2000/01-2001/02

E
 Antony Edwards, 1946/47
 Ejaz Ahmed, 1942/43-1945/46
 Onkar Elhence, 1934/35
 Charles Evette, 1938/39

F
 Farman Ahmed, 2009/10-2011/12
 Fasihuddin, 1938/39
 Fateh Mahomed, 1939/40
 Fazal, 1935/36
 Fahad Samar 2010-11

G
 Gautam Gambhir, 1999/00-2015/16
 Ashok Gandotra, 1965/66-1974/75
 Rajesh Gehlot, 1999/00-2000/01
 Feroze Ghayas, 1992/93-1997/98
 Hari Gidwani, 1972/73-1977/78
 Sanjay Gill, 1999/00-2004/05
 Munish Giri, 1998/99
 Rajinder Goel, 1963/64-1972/73
 Manoj Gupta, 1980/81
 Radhey Gupta, 2001/02-2002/03
 Ranjan Gupta, 2003/04-2005/06
 Vinod Gupta, 1969/70
 Gurbaksh Singh, 1943/44-1946/47
 Gursharan Singh, 1981/82-1985/86
 Gaurav Chhabra 2008-2010
Gourav Kumar, 2018-19

H
 Rajan Handa, 1993/94
 Hargopal Singh, 1943/44-1958/59
 Shekhar Haridas, 1965/66
 Harpreet Singh, 1989/90-1993/94
 Himmat Singh, 2015/16

I
 Idrees Baig, 1935/36-1945/46
 Gokul Inder Dev, 1961/62-1962/63
 Inderjit Singh, 1965/66-1976/77
 Kumar Indrajitsinhji, 1958/59-1960/61

J
 Edward Jackson, 1946/47
 Ajay Jadeja, 2003/04-2004/05
 Aditya Jain, 2005/06-2010/11
 Anil Jain, 1963/64-1965/66
 Devendra Jain, 1984/85
 GC Jain, 1949/50
 Pradeep Jain, 1986/87-1989/90
 Jamilul Hai, 1940/41-1944/45
 Jamilur Rehman, 1938/39
 Jaspal Singh, 1986/87-1987/88
 Jaswant Singh, 1947/48
 Joginder Singh, 2009/10-2010/11
 Johnnie Johnson, 1942/43
 Pankaj Joshi, 1996/97-2000/01
 Sunil Joshi, 1999/00-2003/04
 Ankur Julka, 2009/10-2011/12

K
 BR Kagal, 1934/35
 Ahmed Kamal, 1942/43
 Dharshan Kanjania, 2008/09-2009/10
 Pradeep Kanojia, 1980/81
 Ravinder Kapila, 1980/81
 Ashwini Kapoor, 1984/85-1985/86
 Gian Kapoor, 1947/48-1951/52
 GL Kapoor, 1934/35
 Raj Kapoor, 1993/94
 Praveen Kashyap, 1976/77
 Aditya Kaushik, 2013/14-2015/16
 Khalil-ur-Rehman, 1942/43
 Khallil Ahmed, 1938/39
 Javed Khan, 2013/14
 Anilkumar Khanna, 1955/56-1964/65
 Balbir Khanna, 1948/49
 Satish Khanna, 1947/48-1966/67
 Surinder Khanna, 1976/77-1987/88
 Jogesh Khattar, 1965/66
 Arun Khurana, 1978/79-1982/83
 Shashikant Khurana, 1984/85-1986/87
 Vivek Khurana, 2001/02
 H Kishenchand, 1943/44-1952/53
 Pradeep Kochar, 1980/81-1982/83
 Virat Kohli, 2005/06-2013/14
 Satyendra Kuckreja, 1953/54-1955/56
 Milind Kumar, 2009/10-2015/16
 Pawan Kumar, 1982/83
 Varun Kumar, 2001/02-2005/06

L
 Lakshman, 1936/37
 Akash Lal, 1959/60-1968/69
 Arun Lal, 1974/75-1980/81
 Ishwar Lal, 1939/40-1942/43
 Kunal Lal, 2003/04-2007/08
 Madan Lal, 1972/73-1989/90
 Raman Lamba, 1978/79-1997/98
 Vinay Lamba, 1967/68-1980/81
 Major Leach, 1943/44
 SS Lee, 1976/77
 Lekhraj, 1952/53
 Suresh Luthra, 1967/68-1979/80

M
 Devashish Mahanti, 1982/83
 Mahipetsinhji, 1947/48
 Akash Malhotra, 1993/94-1999/00
 Ashish Malhotra, 1998/99-2006/07
 MC Malhotra, 1952/53-1953/54
 Omi Malhotra, 1949/50-1952/53
 Gagan Malik, 1999/00
 Yesh Manchanda, 1960/61
 Mithun Manhas, 1997/98-2014/15
 Maninder Singh, 1980/81-1993/94
 Manoj Singh, 1993/94-1994/95
 M. H. Maqsood, 1934/35-1944/45
 Ashwini Marwah, 1970/71-1973/74
 Masud Yar Khan, 1940/41
 Anil Mathur, 1970/71-1973/74
 Bishan Mathur, 1940/41-1947/48
 CB Mathur, 1952/53-1959/60
 KL Mathur, 1951/52-1955/56
 RB Mathur, 1964/65-1965/66
 Mazhar Hussain, 1944/45
 Ayudhia Mehra, 1958/59
 Gulshan Rai Mehra, 1957/58-1966/67
 Madan Mehra, 1953/54-1957/58
 Puneet Mehra, 2009/10-2011/12
 Rajan Mehra, 1953/54-1959/60
 Rohit Mehra, 1998/99-1999/00
 Ram Prakash Mehra, 1934/35-1946/47
 Sheel Mehra, 1970/71-1974/75
 Vijay Mehra, 1963/64-1970/71
 Vijay Mishra, 1990/91
 Vikas Mishra, 2009/10-2013/14
 Mohammad Afzal, 1946/47
 Mohammad Ishaq, 1940/41-1944/45
 Sardar Mohammad Khan, 1939/40
 Mohammad Yunus, 1940/41-1945/46
 Mohammad Zafar, 1935/36-1938/39
 Surinder Mohan, 1970/71
 Atul Mohindra, 1986/87-1992/93
 Mohd Javed jr 2007-2008/14

 
 Musa Khan, 1934/35-1939/40

N
 Yogesh Nagar, 2008/09-2015/16
 Chetanya Nanda, 2004/05-2010/11
 Satish Nanda, 1955/56
 Raj Narain, 1966/67-1972/73
 Shiv Narain, 1944/45
 Suraj Narain, 1943/44-1945/46
 Pulkit Narang, 2015/16
 Narender Singh, 2007/08
 Sumit Narwal, 2007/08-2015/16
 Kartar Nath, 1992/93-1996/97
 Manu Nayyar, 1986/87-1993/94
 Syed Nazir Hussain, 1934/35-1936/37
 Narender Negi, 2001/02-2007/08
 Pawan Negi, 2011/12-2015/16
 Ashish Nehra, 1997/98-2015/16
 WH Neville, 1935/36

O
 Praveen Oberoi, 1972/73-1980/81
 Salil Oberoi, 2002/03-2003/04
 Om Kishore, 1949/50
 Om Kishore, 1957/58-1959/60

P
 Karun Pal, 1980/81
 Rajinder Pal, 1954/55-1971/72
 Ravinder Pal, 1964/65-1966/67
 Rishabh Pant, 2015/16
 Parvinder Singh, 1969/70
 Saurabh Passi, 2013/14
 Mansur Ali Khan Pataudi, 1960/61-1964/65
 Sheetal Pathak, 1993/94
 Sudhir Pathak, 1977/78-1981/82
 Rajesh Peter, 1980/81-1983/84
 Bhaskar Pillai, 1982/83-1994/95
 Manoj Prabhakar, 1982/83-1996/97
 Prabjot Singh, 1973/74
 Gyaneshwar Prasad, 1958/59-1973/74
 Sushil Kumar Prasad, 1982/83-1984/85
 Pratyush Singh, 2013/14-2014/15
 Premnath, 1945/46
 Prithviraj, 1950/51
 Dev Puri, 1947/48
 Pururaj Singh, 2003/04

Q
 Qamaruddin Butt, 1946/47

R
 Ravi Raj, 1974/75
 Rajinder Singh, 1980/81-1984/85
 Nitish Rana, 2012/13-2015/16
 Rahul Verma Rajput, 2015/16
 Ranbir Singh, 1966/67-1967/68
 Rashid, 1938/39
 Rajiv Rathore, 1998/99-2002/03
 Abdul Rauf, 1999/00-2002/03
 Balaji Rao, 1955/56-1960/61
 Krishna Rao, 1947/48
 Mohinder Rawal, 1966/67
 Vaibhav Rawal, 2012/13-2015/16
 Kuldeep Rawat, 2002/03-2011/12
 Sarang Rawat, 2015/16
 Maharaja Razdan, 1949/50
 Vivek Razdan, 1991/92-1992/93
 Riazul Hussain, 1939/40
 Robin Singh, Jr., 1994/95-2000/01

S
 Joginder Saberwal, 1951/52-1955/56
 Yogesh Sachdeva, 2005/06-2006/07
 Rohit Sahni, 1971/72
 Navdeep Saini, 2013/14-2015/16
 Ragubhir Saini, 1959/60-1968/69
 Rishit Saini, 2011/12
 Shankar Saini, 1986/87-1990/91
 Salahuddin Khan, 1944/45-1945/46
 Saleem, 1942/43-1946/47
 Satish Salwan, 1994/95-1996/97
 Samarth Singh, 2013/14
 Rahul Sanghvi, 1995/96-2006/07
 Pradeep Sangwan, 2006/07-2015/16
 Sarandeep Singh, 2001/02-2005/06
 Satya Dev, 1958/59
 Daljit Singh Saxena, 1967/68-1976/77
 Laxmi Chand Saxena, 1947/48-1956/57
 Ramesh Saxena, 1960/61-1965/66
 Ravi Sehgal, 1992/93-1995/96
 Sunny Sehrawat, 2011/12
 Virender Sehwag, 1997/98-2014/15
 J Sen, 1940/41-1945/46
 JN Seth, 1949/50
 Raju Sethi, 1980/81-1983/84
 SM Shafi, 1939/40
 Shakti Singh, 1993/94-1996/97
 Shamsunder, 1938/39
 Abhay Sharma, 1987/88-1990/91
 Abhishek Sharma, 2001/02-2009/10
 Ajay Sharma, 1984/85-1999/00
 Chetan Sharma, 2010/11-2011/12
 Davendra Sharma, 1993/94-2000/01
 Deepak Sharma, 1981/82
 Hitesh Sharma, 1991/92-1993/94
 Ishant Sharma, 2005/06-2015/16
 Kshitiz Sharma, 2012/13-2014/15
 Manan Sharma, 2007/08-2015/16
 Mohit Sharma, 2009/10-2013/14
 Rahul Sharma, 1986/87 (played international cricket for Hong Kong)
 Rajkumar Sharma, 1986/87-1990/91
 Sanjay Sharma, 1988/89-1992/93
 Sanjeev Sharma, 1960/61-1963/64
 Sanjeev Sharma, 1983/84-1990/91
 Shivam Sharma, 2014/15-2015/16
 Suhail Sharma, 2005/06-2007/08
 Vishal Sharma, 1999/00-2000/01
 Shelly Shaurya, 2012/13-2013/14
 Shawej Khan, 2010/11
 Sher Mohammad, 1965/66
 Dhruv Shorey, 2012/13-2015/16
 Shujauddin Siddiqi, 1939/40-1945/46
 Anand Shukla, 1965/66
 Rakesh Shukla, 1969/70-1985/86
 Ponnuswami Sitaram, 1956/57-1967/68
 RS Sondhi, 1973/74-1974/75
 Vijay Sondhi, 1963/64-1964/65
 Man Sood, 1956/57-1964/65
 Varun Sood, 2011/12-2014/15
 S Srinivasan, 1949/50
 Shirish Srivastava, 1984/85-1987/88
 Akash Sudan, 2015/16
 Sukhvinder Singh, 1986/87-1992/93
 Sultan, 1936/37
 Amit Suman, 1998/99-2001/02
 Venkat Sunderam, 1970/71-1980/81
 Sunil Dev, 1969/70
 Surajuddin, 1936/37
 Pawan Suyal, 2009/10-2015/16
 Anand Swaroop, 1960/61

T
 Tajammul Hussain, 1934/35-1939/40
 Mayank Tehlan, 2003/04-2010/11
 Praveen Thapur, 1994/95
 Tilak Raj, 1980/81-1983/84
 G Tilak Raj, 1964/65-1967/68
 Vijay Tiwari, 1961/62
 Vikas Tokas, 2012/13-2015/16
 MS Toorie, 1934/35
 Tuljaram, 1947/48-1956/57
 Turab Ali, 1945/46-1946/47

V
 Gautam Vadhera, 1992/93-1995/96
 Ravi Vaid, 1948/49-1958/59
 Sonu Vaid, 2001/02-2002/03
 Sunil Valson, 1977/78-1985/86
 Rajeswar Vats, 1973/74-1975/76
 Bharat Veer, 2009/10
 Siddharth Verma, 2002/03
 Pranshu Vijayran, 2014/15
 Rajiv Vinayak, 1986/87-1995/96
 Hiralal Vohra, 1947/48-1955/56

W
 Atul Wassan, 1986/87-1997/98
 Chester Watson, 1962/63 (played international cricket for West Indies)
 Oniel Wilson, 1990/91-1997/98

Y
 Kapil Yadav, 2008/09-2010/11
 Rahul Yadav, 2008/09-2015/16
 Yakub, 1938/39
 Jitendra Yeshpal, 1956/57-1958/59
 Yusuf Nanjrani, 1940/41

References

Delhi cricketers

cricketers